Malchiner See is a lake between the Mecklenburgische Seenplatte and Rostock (district) districts in Mecklenburg-Vorpommern, Germany. At an elevation of 0.8 m, its surface area is 13.95 km2. It is connected to  Lake Kummerow by the Peene and Dahme rivers. It is part of the Mecklenburg Switzerland and Lake Kummerow Nature Park.

References

External links 

 

Lakes of Mecklenburg-Western Pomerania
LMalchinerSee